FC Transmash Mogilev was a Belarusian football club based in Mogilev.

History
1988: founded as Selmash Mogilev
1994: renamed to Transmash Mogilev
1998: merged with FC Dnepr Mogilev to form Dnepr-Transmash Mogilev

Transmash (Selmash at the time) was playing in Belarusian SSR top league from 1988 to 1991, in Belarusian First League from 1992 till 1996 and in Belarusian Premier League in 1997. In early 1998 Transmash merged with another Mogilev team (FC Dnepr Mogilev) and FC Dnepr-Transmash was formed.

League and Cup history

References

External links
Club profile at footballfacts.ru

Association football clubs established in 1988
Association football clubs disestablished in 1998
Defunct football clubs in Belarus
Sport in Mogilev
1988 establishments in Belarus
1998 disestablishments in Belarus